"Born Cross-Eyed" is an original composition by the San Francisco psychedelic rock group the Grateful Dead. It was written by rhythm guitarist Bob Weir during the band's sessions creating the album Anthem of the Sun, produced by David Hassinger, in 1968. It was released as a B-side with the single "Dark Star", one of the band's best-known musical excursions.

The single was first released in April 1968 by Warner Bros. Records and is a different mix than the version included on the Anthem of the Sun album. The single was re-released in the UK in 1977 as a promotion distributed with the Dark Star magazine. The single release included lyrics of Dark Star on the back cover. While writing the single Weir said he wanted the abrupt, brief breaks in the music to sound like "thick air". The band had lots of strange experimenting during the songwriting process which irritated producer Dave Hassinger so much that he left the studio. David Dodd believes this happened right around 1:32 in the song, just before the lyrics "my how lovely you are, my dear".

This single version of the song would be later released as part of the compilation album What a Long Strange Trip It's Been by Warner Bros. in 1977, the twelve-CD retrospective box set The Golden Road (1965-1973) in 2001, released by Rhino Records (a subsidiary of Warner Bros.), and the 2003 re-release of Anthem of the Sun by Rhino.

Albums

The following are the albums on which the song has appeared:
Studio albums
Anthem of the Sun, Grateful Dead, 1968
Live albums
Dick's Picks Volume 22, Grateful Dead, 2001
Road Trips Volume 2, Number 2, Grateful Dead, 2009

Compilation/Box sets
Some Of Our Best Friends Are, Various Artists, 1969
The Grateful Dead/Anthem Of The Sun, Grateful Dead, 1976
What a Long Strange Trip It's Been, Grateful Dead, 1977
The Golden Road (1965-1973), Grateful Dead, 2001

References

Grateful Dead songs
1968 songs
1968 singles
1977 singles
Songs written by Bob Weir